The Steel Jungle is a 1956 American film noir crime drama directed by Walter Doniger and starring Perry Lopez, Beverly Garland, and Walter Abel. The film was directed and written by Walter Doniger. Produced independently, the film was distributed by Warner Bros., and theatrically released in the United States on March 10, 1956.

Plot
Ed Novak (Perry Lopez), a two-bit bookie, goes to prison rather than squeal on his Syndicate higher-ups. Novak's silence exacts a toll on his wife Frances (Beverly Garland), who is expecting a child. The longer Novak remains in prison, the more he becomes aware that the mob has deserted him — and the more he's willing to spill what he knows. Fellow prisoner Steve Marlin (Ted de Corsia) intends to see that Novak keeps his mouth shut permanently.

Cast
 Perry Lopez as Ed Novak
 Beverly Garland as Frances Novak
 Walter Abel as Bill Keller
 Ted de Corsia as Steve Madden
 Kenneth Tobey as Psychiatrist Lewy
 Bob Steele as Dan Bucci
 Allison Hayes as Mrs. Archer
 Lyle Latell as Bailiff

See also
List of American films of 1956

 Bob Steele filmography

References

External links
 
 

1956 films
1956 crime drama films
1950s prison films
American black-and-white films
American crime drama films
American prison films
Film noir
Films directed by Walter Doniger
Films scored by David Buttolph
Warner Bros. films
1950s English-language films
1950s American films